Columbia-Revelstoke was a provincial electoral district for the Legislative Assembly of British Columbia, Canada.  It made its only appearance on the hustings in the general election of 1933.

For other current and historical ridings in the Kootenay region please see Kootenay (electoral districts).

Electoral history 
Note:  Winners of each election are in bold.

 
|Co-operative Commonwealth Fed.
|Vincent Segur
|align="right"|747 	 	
|align="right"|27.73%
|align="right"|
|align="right"|unknown
 
|Liberal
|William Henry Sutherland
|align="right"|1,947 	 	 		 	 		
|align="right"|72.27%
|align="right"|
|align="right"|unknown
|- bgcolor="white"
!align="right" colspan=3|Total valid votes
!align="right"|2,694
!align="right"|100.00%
!align="right"|
|- bgcolor="white"
!align="right" colspan=3|Total rejected ballots
!align="right"|15
!align="right"|
!align="right"|
|- bgcolor="white"
!align="right" colspan=3|Turnout
!align="right"|%
!align="right"|
!align="right"|
|}

The Columbia-Revelstoke riding was used only in the 1933 election.  From 1937 onwards part of the area was part of Columbia and the Revelstoke area formed the Revelstoke riding.

External links 
 Elections BC Historical Returns

Former provincial electoral districts of British Columbia